The North Branch Division of the Pennsylvania Canal was a historic waterway that ran  along the North Branch Susquehanna River between southern New York and north-central Pennsylvania. At its southern end, the canal connected with the West Branch Canal and the Susquehanna Division Canal at Northumberland, while on the north it connected with the Junction Canal and the New York canal system. Built between 1828 and 1856, the North Branch Canal was part of a large transportation network that included Pennsylvania's Main Line of Public Works.

History
In 1834, a project called the Wyoming Extension increased the canal's length by  past Wilkes-Barre to Pittston.

The complete canal had a total of 43 locks that overcame  of elevation between its end points.

The privately built Junction Canal of  linked the North Branch Canal to Elmira. There the Junction Canal connected with the Chemung Canal, which led north to Seneca Lake and the Erie Canal. Through these connections, boats using the Pennsylvania Canal system were able to travel as far  as Buffalo and Lake Champlain.

In 1858, the canal from Northampton Street in Wilkes-Barre to the state line was sold to the North Branch Canal Company, which in turn sold it to the Lehigh Valley Railroad in 1865.  The railroad laid tracks along portions of the canal towpath and operated both until 1872, when it was authorized by the state legislature to close the canal.

Locks (first segment)

Chenango Extension
In 1863, the New York Legislature authorized construction of another canal, the Chenango Canal Extension, meant to run about  along the North Branch Susquehanna River from Binghamton, New York, to the Pennsylvania – New York border. The plans called for construction of an east–west crosscut canal linking the Chenango Canal Extension to the North Branch Canal, which followed the Chemung River rather than the North Branch Susquehanna River north of Athens. Cost overruns, waning enthusiasm for canals, and funding delays led to abandonment of the project in 1872, after most of the work on the northern  of the line had been completed. Beyond planning, no work had been done on the southernmost  when the project ended.

Remnants

Lock No. 1 and a section of the original North Branch Canal in Northumberland were intact in 1986 as was Lock No. 2 below Bloomsburg.  Occasional sections of canal bed remained between Shickshinny and West Nanticoke, and the West Nanticoke guard lock was intact. Canal bed was visible from the Lackawanna River toward Ransom and largely intact above Vosburg between Lackawanna Campground and Horse Race Falls. At Laceyville a museum known as the Oldest House was once a lockkeeper's house. Other remnants such as crib work, canal embankments, iron spikes, and timbers could be found here and there along the full length of the canal.

Points of interest

See also
 List of canals in the United States

Notes and references
Notes

References

Works cited
 Petrillo, F. Charles (1986). Anthracite and Slackwater: The North Branch Canal 1828–1901. Easton, Pennsylvania: Center for Canal History and Technology. .
 Shank, William H. (1986). The Amazing Pennsylvania Canals, 150th Anniversary Edition. York, Pennsylvania: American Canal and Transportation Center. .
 Whitford, Nobel E., and Beal, Minnie M. (1906). History of the Canal System of the State of New York Together with Brief Histories of the Canals of the United States and Canada, "Chapter 18: The Chenango Canal Extension". Albany, New York: Brandow Printing Company. . Retrieved March 21, 2010.

External links
 Pennsylvania Canal Society
 American Canal Society
 National Canal Museum

Canals in Pennsylvania
Canals opened in 1856
Transportation buildings and structures in Bradford County, Pennsylvania
Transportation buildings and structures in Northumberland County, Pennsylvania
Transportation buildings and structures in Luzerne County, Pennsylvania
Transportation buildings and structures in Columbia County, Pennsylvania
Transportation buildings and structures in Montour County, Pennsylvania